Forgotten Country is a 2012 novel by the American writer Catherine Chung and is published by Riverhead Books. She was recognized by Granta magazine as one of its "New Voices" of 2010.

Plot
The Story is about Janie and her sister Hannah, and their parents, who moved with their parents to the United States from South Korea when the girls were young. Their father felt he needed to flee to escape political persecution under an oppressive government. His older sister Komo had already moved to the US, where her two sons were born. The father and Komo are close, as they were orphaned when young and she took care of them, even when they lived with an uncle's family.

Janie remembered her maternal grandmother telling her that the family "lost" its daughters; that it had lost a daughter in each generation since the Japanese occupation. Janie's mother's older sister was kidnapped from a college dorm by North Korean soldiers who were taking girls, and never returned.

As a teenager, Hannah became rebellious, then left home and cut ties with her parents. Janie needs to find her, as their father is dying of cancer. The girls grew up in the United States, having to adapt to English names given to them in school, English, and changes in culture. Janie has to find her sister before it is too late; her parents have returned to South Korea for recommended treatment for her father, whose cancer has metastasized.

Characters
Janie/Jeehyun/Narrator 
Hannah/Haejin/ Narrator Sister
their parents
their maternal grandmother
Komo, their father's older sister
Gabe, Komo's son, born in the US
Keith, Komo's son, born in the US

Reception
Reviews were highly favorable.

References

External links
Forgotten Country, Goodreads

Korean-American novels
2012 American novels
Novels set in Korea
Riverhead Books books
2012 debut novels